Douglas Mary McKain (20 July 1789 – 3 April 1873) was a New Zealand nurse, midwife and businesswoman. She was born Douglas Mary Dunsmore in Glasgow, Lanarkshire, Scotland on 20 July 1789 and died 3 April 1873 in Napier. She arrived in New Zealand as a widow, accompanied by four sons and a daughter, on the ship Olympus, which arrived in Port Nicholson (Wellington) in April 1841.

References

1789 births
1873 deaths
New Zealand women in business
New Zealand nurses
Scottish emigrants to New Zealand
New Zealand midwives
Scottish nurses
19th-century New Zealand businesspeople